WorkNC is a Computer aided manufacturing (CAM) software developed by Sescoi for multi-axis machining.

History 

The first version of WorkNC CAM software was released by Sescoi, in 1988. The driving forces behind the product were Bruno Marko, president of Sescoi, and Gerard Billard, R&D Innovation Manager.

Salomon Group was the first customer to use WorkNC in 1988 in order to manufacture ski boots and other sports equipment.

In 2002 the company released WorkNC-CAD, followed by WorkNC 5-axis in 2003 and WorkNC G3 in 2007.

In 2008 Sescoi launched WorkXPlore 3D, a collaborative viewer for 3D CAD files that didn't require the original CAD application.

In 2009 the company launched WorkNC Dental, a CAD/CAM software for machining of prosthetic appliances, implants or dental structures, as well as WorkNC Wire EDM, a software for Wire EDM.

In 2010 Sescoi launched WorkNC-CAD Hybrid Modeling, a 3D CAD software for 3D model design, reparation, machining preparation, and surface design capabilities.

In 2010 Sescoi introduced WorkNC Version 21, a 64-bit version with multi-threadingl.

Functionality 
WorkNC CAM main functions include:
Automatic geometry and machining zone detection and management
Toolpaths designed for High Speed Machining
User stock definition (block, CAD, STL)
Dynamic 3 and 3+2 stock Management
Collision detection with automatic stock update
Machining simulation
Tool and tool holder library
HTML workshop documentation.
Estimated machining times can be exported to WorkPLAN
Predefined machining sequences for automatic machining
Machining STL files and point clouds
Batch mode calculations
Postprocessor generator

Roughing toolpaths 
Trochoidal high speed machining 
Collision detection and automatic stock updates
Rest Machining based on dynamic stock

Finishing toolpaths 
Z Level, planar, flat surface , contour, and edge finishing
Rest-material finishing
Automatic 5 Axis conversion

2 and 2.5 Axis toolpaths 
Pocketing, contouring, curve machining, engraving, rib machining, facing, drilling, tapping
Automatic Drilling Module and  pre-defined drilling sequence selection
Automatic feature detection and recognition

5 Axis toolpaths 
Automatic 3 to 5-axis conversion with WorkNC Auto 5 
Simultaneous 4 and 5 Axis toolpaths
5 Axis Rolling, Planar finishing, Spiral Blade, Impeller, Tube, Laser
Collisions detection and machine limits management.

Supported CAD formats 
WorkNC can read the following CAD file formats: 

 DXF
 STEP
 IGES 
 CATIA V4 & V5
 Unigraphics
 SolidWorks 
 SolidEdge 
 Pro/E
 Parasolid
 STL

Products

WorkNC Dental 

Automatic machining of prosthetic appliances, implants, crowns,  bridge implants and dental structures.

Intelligence within the system considers the limitations of the machine tool to automatically produce collision free toolpaths.

WorkNC MPM (Multi-Part Machining)  
A CAD/CAM module that allows multiple parts to be simultaneously machined on the same machine.

WorkNC LMP (Layer Milling Process) 
WorkNC LMP is a CAD/CAM software for cutting parts in layers, a well-known technique for machining deep and narrow cavities.

WorkNC-LMP automatically divides 3D models and creates roughing and finishing toolpaths for each layer. This technology can be used on any machining center, simplifying the programming and cutting of complex shapes by building them up in manageable sections.

Sescoi worked in collaboration with F. Zimmermann, combining the speed and accuracy of the dedicated Zimmermann LMC (Layer Milling Centre) with Sescoi's WorkNC-LMP. By using the software in conjunction with the machine all the toolpaths and special machine control sequences are automatically generated to cut parts in unmanned operation.

The LMC works from underneath, using high-speed techniques to machine each layer in turn. As each layer is roughed and finished a new plate is bonded, ready for the next machining operation, this continues until the finished part is built up. WorkNC-LMP automates this process starting from the CAD model, firstly splitting it into layers, and then generating both the roughing and finishing toolpaths for each layer. This technique is ideal for high speed machining enabling the use of short and rigid cutters, and eliminates the possibility of a collision. WorkNC-LMP allows to select the material from a materials library and controls factors such as surface roughening prior to bonding, cutting adhesive channels to control excess glue, overlapping of cutter paths to remove traces of glue, and paths for the application of adhesive between layers. It provides the visual control of all toolpaths and the calculation of the estimated total machining time.

WorkNC-LMP combines the advantages of generative rapid prototyping with conventional machining, and is the latest example of the company's resolve to make new processes a reality for its customers.

WorkNC Wire EDM 
WorkNC Wire EDM is a CAD/CAM software for Wire Electrical discharge machining. Dialog boxes guide the user through the system. Functions within WorkNC Wire EDM allow the extraction of cross sections, ready for 2- or 4-axis cutting. Alternatively, the 3D surfaces of the CAD model can be used directly.

It also includes graphical verification to automatically check for collisions and the maximum wire angle possible on each individual EDM machine. The latest version makes it easy to extract and link 4-axis wire paths. Dialog boxes guide the user through the process making it simple to add tags, create roughing and finishing wire paths, lead in and out moves, a range of corner strategies, and tag removal cycles. Postprocessors and technology libraries are included for all leading machines.

WorkNC-CAD 
WorkNC-CAD is a manufacturing CAD software with surface and solid modeling functions. It is included free as a standard integrated component of WorkNC. It provides features required to design and manufacture molds, dies, and tooling without the need for additional software applications or outsourcing.

WorkNC-CAD has advanced intelligent surface morphing for filling simple or complex cavities, automatic 2D feature recognition and cycle definition for drilling, counterboring, reaming and tapping, as well as automatic mold and die core separation.

WorkNC-CAD Hybrid Modeling 
WorkNC-CAD Hybrid Modeling (HM) is a 3D CAD software launched by Sescoi in 2010 for 3D model design, reparation and machining preparation, with surface design capabilities integrated with solid modeling functionality in a user friendly environment. It can be used as an independent CAD product. It is powered by D-Cubed software components from Siemens PLM.

WorkNC-CAD HM works on solid and surface models making use of parametric commands to easily manipulate and repair CAD data. Along with multiple CAD translators, it includes modules for electrode creation, core/cavity separation and Wire EDM. The WorkNC Electrode module makes use of the WorkNC-CAD Hybrid Modeling capabilities to extract electrode shapes directly from solid or surface models. The electrode model can be modified and extended, and tool holders added from a library to produce a complete electrode. WorkNC's collision checking ensures the electrode does not collide with any surrounding surfaces, automatically adding extensions as required. Documentation and electrode coordinate systems are produced by the software to ensure correct positioning for the EDM operations.

WorkNC-CAD Hybrid Modeling features include:
 Large visualization area
 Construction tree that enables simplified CAD/CAM entity management
 Context menus accessible in the construction tree and in the graphic window
 Access to features according to context
 Real-time preview of surface and solid modeling functions
 Configurable interface (keyboard shortcuts, position of adjustable toolbars).

When used in its standalone design version by toolmakers in their technical departments, it offers mold, tool and die businesses a uniform CAD product throughout the entire manufacturing process.

WorkXPlore 3D 

WorkXPlore 3D is a 3D viewer for CAD files. A free viewer version and a free evaluation version are available.

References

External links 
Official website

Computer-aided design software
Computer-aided manufacturing software